Ferenc Farkas (1905–2000) was a Hungarian composer.

Ferenc Farkas may also refer to:
 Ferenc Farkas de Boldogfa (1713–1770), Hungarian nobleman, jurist and landowner
 Ferenc Farkas de Kisbarnak (1892–1980), Chief Scout of the Hungarian Boy Scouts, 
 Ferenc Farkas (Zala county auditor) (1838–1908), Hungarian nobleman
 Ferenc Farkas (Jesuit priest) (1742–1803), Jesuit priest and poet